The 2019 Moneta Czech Open was a professional tennis tournament played on clay courts. It was the 26th edition of the tournament which was part of the 2019 ATP Challenger Tour. It took place in Prostějov, Czech Republic between 3–9 June 2019.

Singles main-draw entrants

Seeds

 1 Rankings are as of 27 May 2019.

Other entrants
The following players received wildcards into the singles main draw:
  Marek Jaloviec
  Vít Kopřiva
  Jiří Lehečka
  Jaroslav Pospíšil
  Daniel Siniakov

The following players received entry into the singles main draw as alternates:
  Marco Bortolotti
  Enrico Dalla Valle
  Benjamin Lock
  Ben Patael
  David Poljak

The following players received entry into the singles main draw using their ITF World Tennis Ranking:
  Corentin Denolly
  Sandro Ehrat
  Karim-Mohamed Maamoun
  Arthur Rinderknech
  Peter Torebko

The following players received entry from the qualifying draw:
  Roman Jebavý
  Pavel Nejedlý

Champions

Singles

  Pablo Andújar def.  Attila Balázs 6–2, 7–5.

Doubles

  Philipp Oswald /  Filip Polášek def.  Jiří Lehečka /  Jiří Veselý 6–4, 7–6(7–4).

References

External links
 Official website

2019 ATP Challenger Tour
2019
2019 in Czech tennis
June 2019 sports events in Europe